2,5-Bis(hydroxymethyl)furan (BHMF) is a heterocyclic organic compound, and is a derivative of a broader class of compounds known as furans. It is produced from cellulose and has received attention as a biofeedstock.  It is a white solid, although commercial samples can appear yellowish or tan.

Synthesis
2,5-BHMF may be obtained from the reduction of the formyl group of 5-hydroxymethylfurfural (HMF).  HMF is the product of acid-catalyzed dehydration of fructose.  Fructose is both an isomer of and a derivative of glucose, which can be derived from the hydrolysis of cellulose. The reduction is catalyzed by nickel, copper chromite, platinum oxide, cobalt oxide, or molybdenum oxide, and sodium amalgam, under high temperatures and high hydrogen pressure.  Hydrogenation in the presence of a copper or platinum catalyst in an aqueous environment gives 2,5-BHMF as the main product.  Under more forcing conditions, the furan ring is reduced as well, resulting in 2,5-bis(hydroxymethyl)tetrahydrofuran.

Applications
Functioning as a diol, 2,5-BHF has applications in the manufacture of polyurethane foams and polyesters.

References 

Furans
Diols